Valentina Grigoryevna Mishak (also Valentyna Hryhorivna Myshak, 16 January 1942 – 1 September 2022) was a Soviet competitive volleyball player and Olympic silver medalist. She began playing volleyball in Tiraspol and later played for Burevestnik Odessa.

References

External links
 

1942 births
2022 deaths
People from Tiraspol
Soviet women's volleyball players
Moldovan women's volleyball players
Ukrainian women's volleyball players
Olympic volleyball players of the Soviet Union
Olympic silver medalists for the Soviet Union
Olympic medalists in volleyball
Medalists at the 1964 Summer Olympics
Volleyball players at the 1964 Summer Olympics
Honoured Masters of Sport of the USSR
Burevestnik (sports society) athletes